Antoniades is a Greek surname (similar to Antoniadis and the female versions Antoniadou and Antoniadi). The name is derived from the root name Antonius. Notable people with the name include the following:

Constantin Antoniades (1891 – 1975), Swiss fencer
Marios Antoniades (born 1990), Cypriot footballer

See also

Constantin Antoniade (1880–1954), Romanian jurist and writer
Antoniades v Villiers

References

Greek-language surnames
Patronymic surnames